John Buckley Bradbury  (27 February 1841 – 4 June 1930) was a medical doctor and Downing Professor of Medicine. The chair was discontinued on his death in 1930.

Life
He was born in Saddleworth in Yorkshire the eldest son of John Bradbury a merchant and manufacturer.

He was educated at King's College, London and then Caius College, Cambridge University. From 1866 to 1876 he was a lecturer in Comparative Anatomy at Downing College in Cambridge.

He served as a physician at Addenbrooke's Hospital in Cambridge from 1869 to 1919.

He delivered the Bradshaw Lecture in 1895 and the Croonian Lecture in 1899. He was an expert on sleep disorders and vertigo.

During the First World War he served as a lieutenant colonel in the Royal Army Medical Corps at the Eastern General Hospital.

He died on 4 June 1930 after a week's illness.

He is buried in the Parish of the Ascension Burial Ground in Cambridge, with his second wife Jane Gwatkin. They had one son and two daughters.

References 

 ‘BRADBURY, John Buckley’, Who Was Who, A & C Black, an imprint of Bloomsbury Publishing plc, 1920–2008; online edn, Oxford University Press, Dec 2007 accessed 7 March 2013

External links
 
 

1841 births
1930 deaths
20th-century English medical doctors
Downing Professors of Medicine
Fellows of the Royal Society of Edinburgh
Fellows of the Royal College of Physicians
Alumni of Gonville and Caius College, Cambridge
Alumni of King's College London